The third MTV Romania Music Awards was held on June 3, 2004 at Sala Palatului, Bucharest.

Nominees/Winners

Best Female Artist
Andra - Vreau sărutarea ta 
Delia - Ce vor de la mine 
Loredana - Femeia ta WINNER
Nicola - Dincolo de noapte 
Paula Seling - Timpul

Best Male Artist 
Cheloo - Vicii 
Emanuel - Pentru amîndoi 
Marcel Pavel Doar pentru tine 
Pepe - Amor gitano
Ştefan Bănica, Jr. - Am s-o aştept WINNER

Best Pop
Andra - Vreau sărutarea ta 
Andreea vs Fabrizio - Cînd dansam 
Class - Luna mi-a zîmbit WINNER
Hara - Cine 
Voltaj - Noapte bună

Best Album 
Băieţi buni - BUG Mafia WINNER
Sindromul Tourette - Cheloo 
Fata cu şosete de diamant - Loredana 
Disco-Zone - O-Zone 
450 de oi - Zdob si Zdub

Best Etno 
Benone Sinulescu - Lelita cîrciumăreasa 
Datina - Trec ţiganii 
Etnic - Blestem 
Loredana - Zig-zagga 
Zdob si Zdub - Everybody in the casa mare WINNER

Best Song 
Clipe - 3rei Sud Est WINNER
Româneste - BUG Mafia 
Luna mi-a zîmbit - Class 
Dragostea mea - Holograf 
Dragostea din tei - O-Zone

Best Hip-Hop 
BUG Mafia - Româneste WINNER
Cheloo - Vicii 
Codu’ Penal - Mod de viaţă 
La Familia - Viaţa bună 
Parazitii - Bad joke

Best Group 
3rei Sud Est - Clipe 
BUG Mafia - Româneşte 
Holograf - Dragostea mea 
Simplu - O secundă 
Voltaj - Noapte bună WINNER

Best Dance 
Akcent - Suflet pereche 
Impact - Îngerul meu 
O-Zone - Dragostea din tei WINNER
Sexxy - Sexy şi rea 
Simplu - O secundă

Best Rock 
AB 4 - Cold 
Cargo - Dacă ploaia s-ar opri WINNER
Iris - Nu mă uita 
Vita de vie - Totata 
Zdob si Zdub - Everybody in the casa mare

Best Video 
AB 4 - Cold 
Andra feat. Tiger One - Vreau sărutarea ta WINNER
Anna Lesko - Inocenta 
BUG Mafia - Româneşte 
Loredana - Femeia ta

Best New Act 
Avantgarde -Alina 
Fizz - Eşti fitzoasa 
Gia - Nu mă opri 
Praf în ochi - În mintea ta 
Spicy - Bikini party WINNER

Best Live 
Cheloo 
Loredana 
Partizan 
Vita de vie WINNER
Zdob si Zdub

Best Website 
www.fizz.ro 
www.gia.ro WINNER
www.refflex.ro 
www.vamaveche.ro 
www.voltaj.ro

Free Your Mind
Paşi spre toleranţă (McCann Erickson)

Life Time Achievement Award
Gică Petrescu

References

MTV Romania Music Awards
2004 in Romanian music
Romanian music awards